Villamar is one of 28 parishes (administrative divisions) in Salas, a municipality within the province and autonomous community of Asturias, in northern Spain.

Villages and hamlets
Casazorrina 
Villamar de Abajo (Villamar Dabajo)
Villamar de Arriba (Villamar Derriba)

References

Parishes in Salas